Chris Furrh is an American former child actor, known for starring as Jack Merridew in the 1990 film adaptation of Lord of the Flies.  After this role, he played Nick Bankston in the 1990 telefilm A Family for Joe and Tommy, a castaway teenager in The Wonderful World of Disney film Exile. Then Furrh retired from acting.

Filmography

Film

References

External links
 

Living people
American male film actors
American male child actors
Year of birth missing (living people)
People from San Marcos, Texas
American male television actors